Alberto Emilio Asseff (born 31 October 1942) is an Argentinian lawyer and politician. He served as a National Deputy between 2011 and 2015, representing Buenos Aires province by the alliance between his party UNIR Constitutional Nationalist Party and Compromiso Federal, created by former president Alberto Rodríguez Saá. He was re-elected as a deputy in 2019, but on this occasion for Juntos por el Cambio, in charge since then. He also served as member of Mercosur Parliament from his election in 2015 until 2019 as part of Unidos por una Nueva Alternativa.

He graduated at Law at the University of Buenos Aires in 1968, where he started to be politically active in the Civic Radical Union (UCR). After his graduation, he worked as an advisor in some administrations of UCR's politicians like Ricardo Balbín and Arturo Illia. In 1982 he created the National Constitutional Party, with former members of UCR. In this party was where Alberto Fernández, president of Argentina, make his first steps in politics. Fernandez quit out NCP when Asseff started to be identified with some conservative Argentinian politicians.

For the 2019 Argentine general election, Asseff initially endorsed José Luis Espert for president, but later changed his position and supported Mauricio Macri of Juntos por el Cambio, which was criticized by Espert. He is a cousin of José Asseff, who was president of the Lebanese Club of Buenos Aires.

References

Living people
1942 births
20th-century Argentine lawyers
University of Buenos Aires alumni
Argentine people of Lebanese descent
Members of the Argentine Chamber of Deputies elected in Buenos Aires Province